This List of canal junctions in the United Kingdom is an incomplete list of canal junctions in the United Kingdom that have articles in Wikipedia, in alphabetical order.

See also

Junction (canal)
Canals of Great Britain
History of the British canal system
List of canal aqueducts in the United Kingdom
List of canal basins in the United Kingdom
List of canal locks in the United Kingdom
List of canal tunnels in the United Kingdom

References

Canals in the United Kingdom

Canal junctions
Canal